The East 34th Street Bridge is a concrete open-spandrel bridge in Tacoma, Washington. The bridge was built in 1937 to replace a wood bridge that had previously spanned the gulch. The bridge is constructed of two rib arches, that are supported by  support legs, with spandrel columns between the arches and the bridge's  deck. The concrete railings on the deck are adorned with urn-shaped lampposts.

The bridge was added to the National Register of Historic Places in 1982.

References

Sources
 

Bridges in Tacoma, Washington
Road bridges on the National Register of Historic Places in Washington (state)
National Register of Historic Places in Tacoma, Washington
Bridges completed in 1937
Concrete bridges in the United States
Open-spandrel deck arch bridges in the United States